In physics, aether theories (also known as ether theories) propose the existence of a medium, a space-filling substance or field as a transmission medium for the propagation of electromagnetic or gravitational forces. Since the development of special relativity, theories using a substantial aether fell out of use in modern physics, and are now replaced by more abstract models.

This early modern aether has little in common with the aether of classical elements from which the name was borrowed. The assorted theories embody the various conceptions of this medium and substance.

Historical models

Luminiferous aether

Isaac Newton suggests the existence of an aether in the Third Book of Opticks (1st ed. 1704; 2nd ed. 1718): "Doth not this aethereal medium in passing out of water, glass, crystal, and other compact and dense bodies in empty spaces, grow denser and denser by degrees, and by that means refract the rays of light not in a point, but by bending them gradually in curve lines? ...Is not this medium much rarer within the dense bodies of the Sun, stars, planets and comets, than in the empty celestial space between them? And in passing from them to great distances, doth it not grow denser and denser perpetually, and thereby cause the gravity of those great bodies towards one another, and of their parts towards the bodies; every body endeavouring to go from the denser parts of the medium towards the rarer?"

In the 19th century, luminiferous aether (or ether), meaning light-bearing aether, was a theorized medium for the propagation of light. James Clerk Maxwell developed a model to explain electric and magnetic phenomena using the aether, a model that led to what are now called Maxwell's equations and the understanding that light is an electromagnetic wave. However, a series of increasingly complex experiments had been carried out in the late 1800s like the Michelson–Morley experiment in an attempt to detect the motion of Earth through the aether, and had failed to do so. A range of proposed aether-dragging theories could explain the null result but these were more complex, and tended to use arbitrary-looking coefficients and physical assumptions. Joseph Larmor discussed the aether in terms of a moving magnetic field caused by the acceleration of electrons.

Hendrik Lorentz and George Francis FitzGerald offered within the framework of Lorentz ether theory an explanation of how the Michelson–Morley experiment could have failed to detect motion through the aether. However, the initial Lorentz theory predicted that motion through the aether would create a birefringence effect, which Rayleigh and Brace tested and failed to find (Experiments of Rayleigh and Brace). All of those results required the full application of the Lorentz transformation by Lorentz and Joseph Larmor in 1904. Summarizing the results of Michelson, Rayleigh and others, Hermann Weyl would later write that the aether had "betaken itself to the land of the shades in a final effort to elude the inquisitive search of the physicist". In addition to possessing more conceptual clarity, Albert Einstein's 1905 special theory of relativity could explain all of the experimental results without referring to an aether at all. This eventually led most physicists to conclude that the earlier notion of a luminiferous aether was not a useful concept.

Mechanical gravitational aether 

From the 16th until the late 19th century, gravitational phenomena had also been modelled utilizing an aether. The most well-known formulation is Le Sage's theory of gravitation, although variations on the idea were entertained by Isaac Newton, Bernhard Riemann, and Lord Kelvin. For example, Kelvin published a note on Le Sage's model in 1873, in which he found Le Sage's proposal thermodynamically flawed and suggested a possible way to salvage it using the then-popular vortex theory of the atom. Kelvin later concluded,

None of those concepts are considered to be viable by the scientific community today.

Non-standard interpretations in modern physics

General relativity 

Albert Einstein sometimes used the word aether for the gravitational field within general relativity, but the only similarity of this relativistic aether concept with the classical aether models lies in the presence of physical properties in space, which can be identified through geodesics. As historians such as John Stachel argue, Einstein's views on the "new aether" are not in conflict with his abandonment of the aether in 1905. As Einstein himself pointed out, no "substance" and no state of motion can be attributed to that new aether. Einstein's use of the word "aether" found little support in the scientific community, and played no role in the continuing development of modern physics.

Quantum vacuum 

Quantum mechanics can be used to describe spacetime as being non-empty at extremely small scales, fluctuating and generating particle pairs that appear and disappear incredibly quickly. It has been suggested by some such as Paul Dirac that this quantum vacuum may be the equivalent in modern physics of a particulate aether. However, Dirac's aether hypothesis was motivated by his dissatisfaction with quantum electrodynamics, and it never gained support from the mainstream scientific community.

Physicist Robert B. Laughlin wrote:

Pilot waves 

Louis de Broglie stated, "Any particle, ever isolated, has to be imagined as in continuous "energetic contact" with a hidden medium." However, as de Broglie pointed out, this medium "could not serve as a universal reference medium, as this would be contrary to relativity theory."

See also

Absolute space and time
Apeiron (cosmology)
Frame-dragging
Tests of special relativity
Tests of general relativity
Cosmology

References

Further reading

 

 
 
 Oliver Lodge, "Ether", Encyclopædia Britannica, Thirteenth Edition (1926).
 "A Ridiculously Brief History of Electricity and Magnetism; Mostly from E. T. Whittaker’s A History of the Theories of Aether and Electricity". (PDF format)
 Epple, M. (1998) "Topology, Matter, and Space, I: Topological Notions in 19th-Century Natural Philosophy", Archive for History of Exact Sciences 52: 297–392.

 
Vacuum